Maigret et l'affaire Saint-Fiacre  is a 1959 French crime film directed by Jean Delannoy that stars Jean Gabin as the fictional police detective Jules Maigret. Adapted from the novel l'Affaire Saint-Fiacre by the Belgian writer Georges Simenon, it tells how Maigret goes privately to the aid of his late father's employer who has received an anonymous death threat and, though unable to prevent the death, unmasks the plotters.

Plot
Commissioner Maigret returns to Saint-Fiacre, the village he grew up in, where his father had been estate manager for the family owning the château. The widowed countess has asked him to come urgently because she has received an anonymous letter saying she will die next day, which is Ash Wednesday. He finds the château in a sorry state: its contents are being systematically sold by the countess' young assistant Sabatier and its lands by the current estate manager Gautier and his young son Émile, a bank clerk. They say they are doing this to fund the countess' son Maurice, an alcoholic playboy who rarely visits his now-sick mother.

Early next morning the countess goes to mass at the village church where, on returning to her pew after receiving the sacrament, she falls dead. The local doctor Bouchardon is not surprised, telling Maigret that her heart was weak and that she died of natural causes. When that day's local paper arrives, the front page reports that the young count Maurice killed himself in Paris the day before. But Maurice is in fact alive and has rushed back on learning of his mother's death. Ringing the newspaper, Maigret is told that the report was phoned in last thing without time to check.

Now convinced of a plot to rob and kill the countess, whose young favourite he had once been, Maigret starts his own investigation of what caused her sudden death and who wanted her dead. On returning to her pew she had opened her missal, which has disappeared. He finds it hidden in the sacristry and pasted in it is the newspaper report of her son's suicide. At the time of her death the day's newspapers had not reached the village shop, so somebody brought the cutting from the town where the paper was printed.

Without revealing his hand, Maurice has also been investigating and, while his mother's body is still lying upstairs, organises a macabre dinner party for those he suspects. At it, Maigret accuses both the doctor and the assistant of negligence, but not homicide, and then reveals that the plotters were the manager and his son, who sought to cut out Maurice and enrich themselves. He calls the local police to take them away.

Principal cast

 Jean Gabin: Commissioner Maigret
 Michel Auclair: Maurice de Saint-Fiacre
 Valentine Tessier: Countess de Saint-Fiacre
 Robert Hirsch: Lucien Sabatier
 Paul Frankeur: Doctor Bouchardon
 Michel Vitold: Father Jodet, the parish priest
 Camille Guérini: Gautier, the estate manager
 Serge Rousseau: Émile Gautier, the manager's son

References

External links
 

1959 crime films
1959 films
French crime films
1950s French-language films
Maigret films
Films directed by Jean Delannoy
Films set in France
Films with screenplays by Michel Audiard
Police detective films
1950s police procedural films
1950s French films